Hypatima excellentella is a moth in the family Gelechiidae. It was described by Ponomarenko in 1991. It is found in the Russian Far East, Korea, Japan and Taiwan.

The wingspan is about 13 mm. The forewings are ochreous with scattered brown scales and with several brown fascia narrowly edged with white, as well as a large dark spot accompanied by a small one near the base.

The larvae feed on Quercus mongolica.

References

Hypatima
Moths described in 1991